Synsepalum brenanii is a species of plant in the family Sapotaceae. It is endemic to Cameroon.  Its natural habitat is subtropical or tropical dry forests. It is threatened by habitat loss.

References

Flora of Cameroon
brenanii
Critically endangered plants
Taxonomy articles created by Polbot